Flinthills USD 492 is a public unified school district headquartered in Rosalia, Kansas, United States.  The district includes the communities of Rosalia, Cassoday, Pontiac, and nearby rural areas.

School
The school district operates the following schools:
 Flinthills Middle/High School in Rosalia, 6th to 12th grades
 Flinthills Primary School in Cassoday, PreK to 5th grades

See also
 Kansas State Department of Education
 Kansas State High School Activities Association
 List of high schools in Kansas
 List of unified school districts in Kansas

References

External links
 

School districts in Kansas
Education in Butler County, Kansas